Impetuous Love in Action is a 2014 Chinese-Hong Kong romantic comedy action film directed by Frankie Chan.

Cast
Oscar Sun
Jade Lin
Kenneth Ma
Yushu
Frankie Chan
Irene Wan

Reception
The film has grossed US$0.28 million at the Chinese box office.

Comperation
This action and comedy was compared to Eddie Garcia & Bayani Agbayani's Sanggano't Sanggago.

References

2014 romantic comedy films
Chinese romantic comedy films
Films directed by Frankie Chan
Hong Kong romantic comedy films
2010s Hong Kong films